Gelius is a surname. Notable people with the surname include:

Einar Gelius (born 1959), Norwegian priest 
Jon Gelius (born 1964), Norwegian journalist, brother of Einar
Lisa Gelius (1909–2006), German athlete